Dark Adapted Eye is a compilation album by Danielle Dax, an English experimental musician, formerly of The Lemon Kittens. Released in 1988 on Sire Records on LP, cassette and CD, it consisted of material from albums and singles released on her own label, Awesome Records, and was the first release of her material in North America. After being out of print for years, the CD was reissued in the U.S. by the Noble Rot label in 2008.  In 2019, the U.S. label Rubellan Remasters remastered the album and reissued it on CD with several bonus tracks different from the original release.  All tracks were produced by Dax and co-written by David Knight.

This compilation album could be considered an expanded international edition of her third album, Inky Bloaters, except that it only has 10 of the 11 tracks from that album. "Born to Be Bad" is missing, and only appears on the original Inky Bloaters album.

Cover artwork is by Holly Warburton.

Track listing 

Unless indicated in text in (parentheses), the songs below are from Inky Bloaters.

 "Cat-House" (3:32) ("Cat-House" UK 7"/12" single)
 "Big Hollow Man" (Remix) (4:47)
 "White Knuckle Ride" (2:55) ("White Knuckle Ride" 7"/12" single)
 "When I Was Young" (3:49) ("Where the Flies Are" 7"/12" single)
 "Yummer Yummer Man" (3:26)
 "Fizzing Human-Bomb" (3:43)
 "Whistling for His Love" (3:31)
 "Flashback" (4:20)
 "Inky Bloaters" (3:33)
 "Brimstone in a Barren Land" (4:29)
 "Bad Miss 'M'" (2:45)
 "Touch Piggy's Eyes" (4:08) ("Cat-House" UK 12" single)

Sire CD & Cassette/Noble Rot CD Bonus Tracks
 "House-Cat" (3:31) ("Cat-House" UK 7"/12" single)
 "Bed Caves" (3:09) (Pop-Eyes)
 "Sleep Has No Property" (4:32)
 "Hammerheads" (3:12) (Jesus Egg That Wept)
 "Pariah" (3:45) (Jesus Egg That Wept)
 "Where the Flies Are" (3:14)
 "Funtime" (3:19)

Rubellan Remasters CD Bonus Tracks
 "Sleep Has No Property" (4:29)
 "Where the Flies Are" (3:13)
 "Funtime" (3:20)
 "Cold Sweat" (6:00) ("White Knuckle Ride" UK 12" Single; "Cat-House" U.S. 12" Single)
 "Cat-House (Overnight Mix)" (4:58) ("Cat-House" U.S. 12" Single)
 "White Knuckle Ride (Remix)" (2:48) ("Cat-House" U.S. 12" Single)
 "Whistling for His Love (12" Remix)" (6:15) ("Whistling for His Love" U.S. promotional 12" Single; Just Say Mao (Volume III of Just Say Yes) U.S. compilation CD)

References

External links
Danielle Dax Official Website

1988 compilation albums
Sire Records compilation albums
Danielle Dax albums